This is the list of episodes for Late Night with Jimmy Fallon, an American late-night talk show that aired weeknights at 12:35 am Eastern/11:35 pm Central on NBC in the United States. The hour-long show aired from March 2, 2009 to February 7, 2014 and was hosted by actor, comedian and performer Jimmy Fallon, an alumnus of Saturday Night Live. Hip hop/neo soul band The Roots served as the show's house band, and Steve Higgins as the show's announcer.

Episodes

2009–2014

References

External links
 
 Lineups at Interbridge 

Late Night with Jimmy Fallon
Late Night with Jimmy Fallon
Episodes